Zero Discrimination Day is an annual day celebrated on 2nd of March each year by the United Nations (UN) and other international organisations. The day aims to promote equality before the law and in practice throughout all of the member countries of the UN. The day was first celebrated on March 1, 2014, and was launched by UNAIDS Executive Director Michel Sidibé on 27 February of that year with a major event in Beijing.

In February 2017, UNAIDS called on people to "make some noise around zero discrimination, to speak up and prevent discrimination from standing in the way of achieving ambitions, goals and dreams."

The day is particularly noted by organisations like UNAIDS that combat discrimination against people living with HIV/AIDS. "HIV related stigma and discrimination is pervasive and exists in almost every part of the world including our Liberia", according to Dr. Ivan F. Camanor, Chairman of the National AIDS Commission of Liberia. The UN Development Programme also paid tribute in 2017 to LGBTI people with HIV/AIDS who face discrimination.

Campaigners in India have used this day to speak out against laws making discrimination against the LGBTI community more likely, especially during the previous campaign to repeal the law (Indian Penal Code, s377) that used to criminalise homosexuality in that country, before that law was overturned by the Indian Supreme Court in September 2018.

In 2015, Armenian Americans in California held a 'die-in' on Zero Discrimination Day to remember the victims of the Armenian genocide.

References

See also 
Anti-discrimination law
Zero tolerance

United Nations days
March observances
LGBT-related observances

External links 

 Zero Discrimination Day at UNAIDS